Originally, Su-Preme was the primary producer of Sunz of Man. He produced their demo album (when the group was called Da Last Future) while still forming and taking shape as the first to be signed Wutang affiliates. He also produced some songs on the shelved Sunz of Man album Nothing New Under the Sun. Su-Preme was credited as producing the songs "Natural High" and "Israeli News" on the Sunz of Man debut album, The Last Shall be First. He is closely associated with Shabazz the Disciple, having produced for his solo pieces.

Production credits

References

Year of birth missing (living people)
Living people
Five percenters
Hip hop record producers
Wu-Tang Clan affiliates
Sunz of Man members